Sipán is a Moche archaeological site in northern Peru.

Sipan may also refer to:
Šipan, a Croatian island
Mount Sipan, a mountain near Lake Van
Sipan, Armenia
Sipán, Spain, a village in the municipality of Loporzano

See also
Saipan (disambiguation)